Acastellina is a genus of minute trilobites in the order Phacopida, which existed in what is now Germany. It was described by Richter and Richter in 1954. The type species is Acastellina nolens, originally described as a species of Acastella.

References

External links
 Acastellina at the Paleobiology Database

Devonian trilobites of Europe
Acastidae
Fossils of Germany

pl:Acastellina